Hava Hareli (1917–2008) was an Israeli diplomat and ambassador who served in a variety of positions including members of the permanent mission to the UN, Ambassador to Norway and Ambassador to Iceland (concurrent appointment 1978–1981). She also served as Deputy Permanent Representative to the Office of the United Nations at Geneva.  Hareli also served as a translator Involved in the trial of Adolf Eichmann.

She was on the Israeli delegation to the United Nations from at least 1958–1964.

Hareli was born in Vienna, Austria-Hungary.

References

Israeli women diplomats
Israeli women ambassadors
Austrian emigrants to Israel
Israeli expatriates in the United States
Israeli expatriates in Switzerland
Ambassadors of Israel to Norway
Ambassadors of Israel to Iceland
1917 births
2008 deaths